Mount Tabor is a New Jersey Transit station in Denville, New Jersey along the Morristown Line just west of the small community of Mount Tabor in Parsippany-Troy Hills, New Jersey. The station consists of one side platform and 48 parking spaces for commuters. One of these parking spaces is handicapped-accessible.

History 
The first station at Mount Tabor was originally built by the Delaware, Lackawanna and Western Railroad on August 19, 1881 under the supervision of a man from Newark named John Scannell. The station depot was razed on June 15, 1971 after falling into a state of disrepair.

Station layout

The station has two tracks with a low-level side platform on Track 1. Access from the platform to Track 2 is provided via a walkway over the tracks, though not all trains stop at this station.

References

External links

NJ Transit Rail Operations stations
Parsippany-Troy Hills, New Jersey
Former Delaware, Lackawanna and Western Railroad stations
Railway stations in the United States opened in 1881
Railway stations in Morris County, New Jersey
1881 establishments in New Jersey